Donald Henderson Clarke (August 24, 1887 – March 27, 1958) was an American writer and journalist, known for his romantic novels, mystery fiction, and screenplays.

Biography
Clarke was born August 24, 1887 in South Hadley, Massachusetts and died March 27, 1958 in Delray Beach, Florida. John Ford directed many of his screenplays.

Bibliography

Novels
Louis Beretti (1929) Also published as Louis Beretti: The Story of a Gunman.(A. A. Knopf: London, 1930.)
Basis of his screenplay for the 1930 film, Born Reckless    
Translated into French as Louis Beret (1933) and as Un nommé Louis Beretti (1949)
Translated into German as Louis Beretti (1933)
Translated into Spanish as Un hombre llamado Louis Beretti (1981)
In the Reign of Rothstein (1929)
Review, by Helen Gregory MacGill American Journal of Sociology, Sep., 1931, vol. 37, no. 2, p. 345
Millie (1930)
Basis of the 1931 film Millie
Impatient Virgin (1931)
Filmed as The Impatient Maiden (1932)
Translated into Czech as Nedočkavá panna : Román dívky (1933) OCLC 85513940
Translated into German as Ruth, die es nicht erwarten kann (1933) OCLC 72099467
Young and Healthy (1931)
John Bartel, Jr. (1932)
Female (1933)
Basis of the 1933 film Female
Translated into Czech as Samička : Román ženy (1934)
Pilgrimage (1933)
Basis of the 1933 film Pilgrimage
Alabama (1934)
Translated into Czech as Missis Alabam (1934)
Kelly (1935)
Lady Ann (1935)
Nina (1935)
Confidential (1936)
Translated into French as Strictement confidentiel (1981)
Millie's Daughter (1939)
Basis of 1947 film Millie's Daughter and of the 1956 episode "Millie's Daughter" in Lux Video Theater
A Lady Named Lou (1946)
Translated into Dutch as Lou, een vrouw met temperament (1949) 
Tawny (1946)
The Chastity of Gloria Boyd  (1946)
The Housekeeper's Daughter (1947)
Basis of the 1939 film The Housekeeper's Daughter
That Mrs. Renney. (1947)
Regards to Broadway (1947)
The Regenerate Lover (1948)
Murderer's Holiday (1948) translated into French as Berretti pas mort! (1953)
Joe and Jennie (1949)
Kelly, etc.  (1960)
青春の秘密 / Seishun no himitsu (Secret of Youth) Chinese translation of ??  (1951)
Address mezarlık (Address Cemetery) Turkish translation of ?? (1981)

Screenplays
Born Reckless (1930 film) from his novel of the same name
The Women Men Marry  (1937) from story by Matt Taylor
The Ghost Ship (1943 film) from story by  Leo Mittler

Autobiography
Man of the World; Recollections of an Irreverent Reporter (1951)
Reviewed in the New York Times Book Review,

References

External links
 
 

1887 births
1958 deaths
20th-century American novelists
American male novelists
American male screenwriters
American mystery writers
People from South Hadley, Massachusetts
Novelists from Massachusetts
20th-century American male writers
Screenwriters from Massachusetts
20th-century American screenwriters